The Hong Kong Medical Association (HKMA), formerly called the Hong Kong Chinese Medical Association, is a medical association based in Hong Kong.

Founded in 1920, the Association brings together all medical practitioners practising in, and serving the people of, Hong Kong. Its objective is to promote the welfare of the medical profession and the health of the public. With the current membership of over 8,000 from all sectors of medical practice, it speaks collectively for its members and aims to keep its members abreast of medical ethics and issues around the world.

The Association takes pride in displaying in its emblem its motto in Chinese which translates as "to safeguard the health of the people" to pronounce the sacred duty of a medical practitioner to look after his/her patients.

To represent the interests of medical practitioners in Hong Kong, the Association nominates members to serve various medical and related statutory and non-statutory institutions including the Medical Council of Hong Kong, Council of Smoking and Health (COSH), Pharmacy and Poisons Board, etc.

References

Organizations established in 1920
Medical associations in Hong Kong